Area code 684 is a telephone area code in the North American Numbering Plan (NANP) for American Samoa. The numbering plan area comprises the seven islands of Tutuila, Aunuʻu, Ofu, Olosega, Taʻū, Swains Island, and Rose Atoll.

History
Previous to joining the North American Numbering Plan, American Samoa used the ITU country code 684. It became the only area south of the equator that is part of the NANP.

The entry of American Samoa into the North American Numbering Plan was authorized by the Federal Communications Commission (FCC) on December 24, 2002. Area code 684 was assigned on January 24, 2003.  The area code was installed on October 2, 2004, when a six-month permissive dialing period started, and central office code were available for order. When the area code was installed, American Samoa had one rater center, and ten central offices. All calls within the numbering plan area are local calls, dialed with seven digits, or with the prefix 0 and the area code. The long-distance access code is 1.

As of 2020, additional central office prefixes were 248, 252, 254, 256, 272, 630, 731, 770, and 782.

See also 
 Telecommunications in American Samoa

References

External links
 List of exchanges from AreaCodeDownload.com, 684 Area Code

684
Communications in American Samoa
Telecommunications-related introductions in 2004